Solar cycle 13 was the thirteenth solar cycle since 1755, when extensive recording of solar sunspot activity began. The solar cycle lasted 11.8 years, beginning in March 1890 and ending in January 1902.  The maximum smoothed sunspot number observed during the solar cycle was 146.5 (January 1894), and the starting minimum was 8.3. During the minimum transit from solar cycle 13 to 14, there were a total of 934 days with no sunspots.

There were a number of intense solar proton events during solar cycle 13, as well as geomagnetic storms such as in September 1898 which affected telegraph lines.

See also
List of solar cycles

References

Solar cycles